Football 7-a-side competitions at the 2007 Parapan American Games in Rio de Janeiro was held from 13 – 18 August 2007 at the Centro de Hóquei sobre.

Participating teams and officials

Qualifying
A total of five teams will qualify to compete in the football five a side competition. The host nation (Brazil) automatically qualifies a team. A team may consist of a maximum of 14 athletes.

Squads
The individual teams contact following football gamblers on to:

Venues
The venues to be used for the World Championships were located in Hóquei sobre Grama, Rio de Janeiro.

Format

The first round, or group stage, was a competition between the 6 teams divided among two groups of three, where engaged in a round-robin tournament within itself. The two highest ranked teams in each group advanced to the knockout stage for the position one to four, the third-placed teams play for the fifth place.

Classification
Athletes with a physical disability competed. The athlete's disability was caused by a non-progressive brain damage that affects motor control, such as cerebral palsy, traumatic brain injury or stroke. Athletes must be ambulant.

Players were classified by level of disability.
C5: Athletes with difficulties when walking and running, but not in standing or when kicking the ball.
C6: Athletes with control and co-ordination problems of their upper limbs, especially when running.
C7: Athletes with hemiplegia.
C8: Athletes with minimal disability; must meet eligibility criteria and have an impairment that has impact on the sport of football.

Teams must field at least one class C5 or C6 player at all times. No more than two players of class C8 are permitted to play at the same time.

Group stage
The first round, or group stage, was a competition between the 6 teams divided among two groups of three.

Group A

Group B

Knockout stage

Semi-finals

Finals
Position 5-6

Position 3-4

Final

Statistics

Ranking

See also

Football 7-a-side at the 2008 Summer Paralympics

References

External links
2007 Parapan American Games Rio de Janeiro, Schedule and Results (rio2007.org.br) from 21 August 2007
Cerebral Palsy International Sports & Recreation Association (CPISRA)
International Federation of Cerebral Palsy Football (IFCPF)

Football 7-a-side
2007